Granberg is a surname. Notable people with the surname include:

 Carolina Granberg (1818-1884), Swedish ballerina
 Devlin Granberg (born 1995), American baseball player
 Emanuel Granberg (1754–1797), Finnish painter
 Fredde Granberg (born 1970), Swedish actor, playwright and director
 Jeanette Granberg (1825–1857), Swedish writer and playwright
 Joonas Granberg (born 1986), Finnish professional golfer
 Kurt M. Granberg (born 1953), American politician
 Lars U. Granberg (born 1965), Swedish politician
 Louise Granberg (1812–1907), Swedish playwright and theatre director
 Petter Granberg (born 1992), Swedish professional ice hockey player